Makongeni is in Nairobi. Makongeni has been built for rail workers in the mid-20th century. The County Rep for Makongeni ward in Nairobi County is Peter Imwatok of ODM party. A Makongeni Primary School exists in Makongeni and a Makongeni Secondary School exists near Makongeni estate.

See also 

Kambi Muru
Raila
Shilanga
Siranga

References 

Suburbs of Nairobi
Slums in Kenya